4NT may refer to:

 4NT (bridge), a bid in the game of bridge, especially contract bridge
 4NT (shell), a command-line interpreter for Microsoft Windows
 4NT internal variable